Narcinops is a genus of electric rays within the family Narcinidae.

Species 

 Narcinops lasti 
 Narcinops nelsoni 
 Narcinops ornatus 
 Narcinops tasmaniensis 
 Narcinops westraliensis

References 

Narcinidae
Ray genera